Averyanovka is a rural locality (a selo) and the administrative centre of Averyanovsky Selsoviet, Kizlyarsky District, Republic of Dagestan, Russia. The population was 3,532 as of 2010. There are 50 streets.

Nationalities 
Dargins, Avars, Russians, Laks, Lezgins, Tabasarans and Tsakhurs live there.

Geography 
Averyanovka is located 3 km southeast of Kizlyar (the district's administrative centre) by road. Kizlyar and Yefimovka are the nearest rural localities.

References 

Rural localities in Kizlyarsky District